Oluwatobi Antigha (born March 16, 1993) is a professional Canadian football linebacker and defensive lineman for the Edmonton Elks of the Canadian Football League (CFL). He played college football for the Presbyterian Blue Hose.

Professional career
Antigha played for two seasons with the Saskatchewan Roughriders before joining the Toronto Argonauts as a free agent on February 13, 2019. After fulling his one-year contract with the Argonauts, he signed with the Blue Bombers on February 13, 2020. He signed a one-year contract extension with the Blue Bombers on January 8, 2021.

Edmonton Elks
Antigha joined the Edmonton Elks in free agency on February 8, 2022. The Elks signed Antigua to a contract extension on February 16, 2023.

References

External links
Edmonton Elks bio

1993 births
American football defensive linemen
American players of Canadian football
Canadian football defensive linemen
Living people
Players of American football from Tampa, Florida
Players of Canadian football from Tampa, Florida
Saskatchewan Roughriders players
Presbyterian Blue Hose football players
Toronto Argonauts players
Winnipeg Blue Bombers players